Javier Vicente Manso de Velasco (2 December 187814 January 1977) was a politician, nationalist, and the son of Manuel Maria Vicente. He was an industrialist and a member of the Basque Nationalist Party, and founded the Euzkadi newspaper in 1913, together with Jose Maria Goia and Luis Arroyo. He founded and directed the nationalist association Juventud Vasca in Bilbao (1912–1916). He was one of the promoters in 1918, and was involved in the creation of the newspapers Excelsior and La Tarde. As a result of the 1936 war, he moved to Lapurdi and represented the Basque Government in Bayonne in the years 1940 to 1959.

References 
 Part of the content of this article was inserted from the Lur encyclopaedic dictionary or the Lur thematic encyclopedia on 27 December 2011. The copyright holder, the Basque Government , has published these dictionaries under the CC-BY 3.0 license on the Open Data Euskadi website .
 https://gw.geneanet.org/sanchiz?lang=en&p=francisco+javier&n=gortazar+manso+de+velasco&oc=1
 https://bmb.bilketa.eus/Gortazar-Javier?lang=fr

Citations

Basque Nationalist Party politicians
Nationalist Congress Party politicians
1878 births
1977 deaths
People from Bilbao